This is a list of airports in Greece, grouped by type and sorted by location.

Greece, officially the Hellenic Republic, is a country in southeastern Europe, situated on the southern end of the Balkan Peninsula. It has land borders with Albania, North Macedonia and Bulgaria to the north, and Turkey to the east. The Aegean Sea lies to the east of mainland Greece, the Ionian Sea to the west and the Mediterranean Sea to the south.

Greece is divided into 13 regions (the official regional administrative divisions), including nine on the mainland and four island groups. The regions are further subdivided into 74 regional units. The country has many islands (approximately 1,400, of which 227 are inhabited), including Crete, the Dodecanese, the Cyclades and the Ionian Islands among others.

Airports 

ICAO location identifiers link to airport's page at Hellenic Civil Aviation Authority.

See also 
 List of airports by ICAO code: L#LG – Greece
 List of the busiest airports in Greece
 Transport in Greece
 Wikipedia:WikiProject Aviation/Airline destination lists: Europe#Greece

References 
 Hellenic Civil Aviation Authority: AIP (Aeronautical Information Publication)
 Greek Airports at Hellenic Civil Aviation Authority website
 Greek Airport Guide at Alexandroupolis Airport website
  Greek Airports at airliners.GR
 Greek Airports
 
 
  – includes IATA codes
 
 

Greece
 
Airports
Airports
Greece